Charaxes (Polyura) caphontis is a butterfly in the family Nymphalidae. It was described by William Chapman Hewitson in 1863. It is endemic to Fiji.

Subspecies
C. c. caphontis (Viti Levu Island, Ovalu Island, Taveuni Island)
C. c. nambavatua Smiles, 1982 (Vanua Mbbalavu Island)

References

External links
Polyura Billberg, 1820 at Markku Savela's Lepidoptera and Some Other Life Forms

Polyura
Butterflies described in 1863
Endemic fauna of Fiji
Butterflies of Oceania
Taxa named by William Chapman Hewitson
Insects of Fiji